There are over 20,000 Grade II* listed buildings in England. This page is a list of these buildings in the metropolitan borough of Kirklees in West Yorkshire.

List

|}

Notes

External links

 
Lists of Grade II* listed buildings in West Yorkshire
Listed